Janet Katherine Cree (1910 –1992) was a British painter specializing in egg tempera.

The daughter of Arthur Thomas Crawford "Dick" Cree, a barrister, and Ivy Williams, an artist, she was born in London. Her father was killed at Ypres in May 1915 while serving with the Durham Light Infantry. Cree attended the Byam Shaw School of Art from 1928 to 1933. Her 1932 work The Oriental Portrait was acquired by the Tate gallery. She was commissioned by Bishop George Bell of Chicester to paint murals for churches. She married the barrister John Platts-Mills in 1936. Cree stopped painting during the late 1930s to raise her family, only resuming her art career in 1967. She exhibited her work in various galleries in London and Sussex, also showing regularly with the Royal Academy. She returned to New Zealand with her husband in 1981. Cree died in 1992 at the age of 82 from complications after undergoing heart surgery.

References

External links
 

1910 births
1992 deaths
20th-century English painters
20th-century English women artists
Alumni of the Byam Shaw School of Art
English women painters
Painters from London